The name Monte Cristi or  Montecristi may refer to the following places:

Dominican Republic 
 Monte Cristi Province
 Monte Cristi, Dominican Republic, the capital of Monte Cristi Province
 Monte Cristi National Park

Ecuador 
 Montecristi Canton, a canton in Manabí Province
 Montecristi, Ecuador, the capital of Montecristi Canton

See also 
 Monte Cristo (disambiguation)